is the Japanese word for salt-water eels, normally referring to ma-anago (Conger myriaster). Ma-anago are used for a seafood dish in Japan. They are often simmered (sushi) or deep-fried (tempura), compared to unagi (freshwater eels) which are usually barbecued with a sauce (kabayaki).  Anago is also slightly less rich and oily than unagi. Anago has a very soft texture and sweet taste.

Species
 Heteroconger hassi (Klausewitz & Eibl-Eibesfeldt 1959)
 Ariosoma anago, Anago anago or Conger anago (Temminck et Schlegel, 1846)
 Conger cinereus (Rüppell, 1830)
 Conger japonicus (Bleeker, 1879)
 Conger myriaster (Brevoort, 1856)
 Gorgasia japonica (Abe, Asai & Miki 1977)

References

Japanese seafood
Japanese cuisine

fr:Conger myriaster
nl:Conger myriaster
ja:アナゴ